The Haima 8S is a compact crossover SUV that is manufactured by the Chinese manufacturer Haima.

Overview

The Haima 8S was launched in the Chinese market in July 2019 and is based on the Haima HMGA platform (Haima Global Architecture). The Haima 8S was powered by the Boost Blue Power 1.6 liter TGDI turbo inline-four petrol engine producing  and 293 Nm mated to a 6-speed manual gearbox, a 6-speed semi-automatic gearbox, or a 7-speed DCT. A 1.2 liter turbo engine hybrid model and mild hybrid versions are set to launch in the future.

Technical features
The Haima 8S comes equipped with the ADAS active safety system and 360 degree camera assist, TPMS, ESP, panoramic sunroof, push-button start, electronic gear shifting with steering mounted paddle shifters, ACC adaptive cruise, AEB, electronically adjustable seats, power rear tailgate, and optional mobile phone wireless charging.

References

External links

 Official website
 Haima 8S

Haima vehicles
FAW Group vehicles
Cars of China
Crossover sport utility vehicles
Compact sport utility vehicles
Cars introduced in 2019